Robert Boyd was the 3rd Accountant General and Civil Auditor in British Ceylon. He was appointed on 29 September 1802, succeeding Thomas Frazer, and held the office until 1 October 1806. He was succeeded by Samuel Tolfrey. 

Sent as a civil servant to Ceylon in 1801, Boyd became Commissioner of Revenue, and was retired in 1836. He became treasurer in 1809.

References

Auditors General of Sri Lanka
British colonial governors and administrators in Asia
Year of birth missing
Year of death missing